Old Dogs is a 2009 American comedy film directed by Walt Becker and starring John Travolta and Robin Williams with an ensemble supporting cast played by Kelly Preston, Matt Dillon, Justin Long, Seth Green, Rita Wilson, Dax Shepard, Lori Loughlin, and Bernie Mac. It was released in theaters on November 25, 2009 and it was released on March 9, 2010 on DVD.

The movie is dedicated to both Mac (who died in August 2008 and had his final acting role in the film) and Jett Travolta (John Travolta and Kelly Preston's son who died in January 2009). The film was panned by critics and grossed $96.7 million worldwide on a $35 million budget. At the 30th Golden Raspberry Awards ceremony, Old Dogs was nominated in four categories: Worst Picture, Worst Actor for John Travolta, Worst Supporting Actress for Kelly Preston and Worst Director for Walt Becker.

Canadian musician Bryan Adams wrote the theme song for the film, "You've Been a Friend to Me".

Plot
Dan Rayburn and Charlie Reed are best friends and co-owners of a successful sports marketing firm. Seven years prior, Dan, recently divorced, married Vicki after being whisked away by Charlie for a tropical vacation. The marriage, however, is short lived. Seven years later, Vicki resurfaces to tell him that their short marriage resulted in something he never suspected: twins Zach and Emily.

As Vicki is facing jail time for her work as an environmental activist, and her friend Jenna is hospitalized from a freak accident, she asks Dan to take care of the kids while she does her time. Thinking this might be his chance to get back with Vicki, Dan agrees, but only if Charlie helps him as neither have any experience taking care of kids. At the same time, they must finalize a huge marketing deal with a Japanese company, something they've always dreamed of, but will take all of their talents to clinch.

As Dan's condo does not allow children, they have to board with Charlie. Charlie and Dan's attempts to take care of the kids are well-intentioned, but very awkward. On a trip with the kids to an overnight camp, a hard-nosed camp instructor, Barry, becomes convinced that Dan and Charlie are homosexual partners. The trip ends after Dan accidentally sets a beloved statue of the camp's founder on fire.

The kids then proceed to spill and replace Charlie and Dan's prescriptions, mixing them up in the process. Dan then must play a game of golf with the Japanese executives while experiencing extreme side effects and Charlie tries to woo Amanda with a face frozen by the pills.

Desperate to help Dan communicate with the children despite his inexperience with children, Charlie recruits his friend Jimmy Lunchbox, a famous, flamboyant children's entertainer. Jimmy comes by and straps Dan and Charlie in motion controlled puppet suits so Charlie can help Dan make all the right moves with his daughter while having a tea party.

The suits malfunction, but Dan speaks from the heart, winning over Emily and making Jimmy emotional. Everything is great with Vicki as she returns home after serving her time. However, the guys have sealed their Japanese deal, sending junior associate Craig to Tokyo. When he goes missing after his arrival, Charlie and Dan must fly to Tokyo themselves to take his place. Dan must leave the kids and Vicki despite his and their desire to be a family.

Once in Tokyo, Dan realizes what he really wants is to be a good father. He leaves the meeting without sealing the deal, angering Charlie. Later, they make up and rush with Craig, who has returned from Tokyo, to Vermont for the kids' birthday party. They don't  get into the Burlington Zoo in time and are forced to break in. However, they mistakenly wind up in the gorilla enclosure, in which they encounter an angry one. Though Dan and Charlie escape and are attacked by penguins, Craig is captured by the gorilla, which takes a strong liking to him as he sings All Out of Love.

Dan then pays a birthday party performer hired by Vicki to use his jet pack and suit, flies into the ceremony and wins over his kids again. When the jet pack stops working in mid-air, he falls into a lake and is taken to an ambulance on a stretcher. One year later, Dan and Vicki are together, Charlie has married Amanda, and Craig has become like a new "uncle" to the kids.

Cast
 John Travolta as Charlie Reed
 Robin Williams as Daniel "Dan" Rayburn
 Kelly Preston as Vicki Greer
 Ella Bleu Travolta as Emily Greer
Conner Rayburn as Zach Greer
 Lori Loughlin as Amanda
 Seth Green as Craig White
 Rita Wilson as Jenna
 Bernie Mac as Jimmy Lunchbox
 Matt Dillon as Troop Leader Barry
 Justin Long as Troop Leader Adam (uncredited)
 Dax Shepard as Child Proofer Gary (uncredited)
 Luis Guzmán as Child Proofer Nick (uncredited)
 Sab Shimono as Yoshiro Nishamura
 Kevin W. Yamada as Riku
 Ann-Margret as Martha
 Amy Sedaris as Condo Woman
 Laura Allen as Kelly
 Bradley Steven Perry as Soccer Kid
 Dylan Sprayberry as Soccer Kid
 Paulo Costanzo as Zoo Maintenance (uncredited)
 DeRay Davis as Zoo Security Guard (uncredited)
 Paul Thornton as Restaurant Patron (uncredited)
 Residente as Tattoo Artist
 Tom Woodruff Jr. as Gorilla

Muppet performers
The following have performed the puppets in Jimmy Lunchbox's show and are credited as "Muppets":

 Bruce Connelly
 Josh Cohen
 Joe Kovacs 
 John Kennedy
 Edward Noel MacNeal
 Matt Vogel

Reception

Critical response
Old Dogs was panned by critics. On Rotten Tomatoes, the film holds a rating of 5%, based on 110 reviews, with an average rating of 2.70/10. The site's consensus reads, "Its cast tries hard, but Old Dogs is a predictable, nearly witless attempt at physical comedy and moral uplift that misses the mark on both counts." The film was ranked number three on their list of the ten most moldy films of 2009.
At Metacritic, Old Dogs received an aggregated rating of 19 out of 100, based on 22 reviews, indicating "overwhelming dislike." Audiences polled by CinemaScore gave the film an average rating of "B+".

Film critic Roger Ebert gave Old Dogs a rating of one star out of a possible four. Ebert opened his review commenting, "Old Dogs is stupefying (sic) dimwitted. What were John Travolta and Robin Williams thinking of? Apparently their agents weren't perceptive enough to smell the screenplay in its advanced state of decomposition".

The Salt Lake Tribune gave Old Dogs a rating of zero stars out of a possible four, and criticized the film for "hammy acting and sledgehammer editing". Film critic Roger Moore of The Orlando Sentinel gave Old Dogs a rating of one and a half stars out of a possible four. "Trashing Old Dogs is a bit like kicking a puppy. But here goes. The new comedy from some of the folks who brought us Wild Hogs is badly written and broadly acted, shamelessly manipulative and not above stopping by the toilet for a laugh or two," wrote Moore.

Bill Goodykoontz of The Star Press gave the film a critical review, and commented, "Old Dogs, which stars Robin Williams and John Travolta as a couple of aging bachelors who suddenly have twins thrust upon them, delivers everything you’d expect. Which is: not much." He concluded his review with, "Let’s hope Williams, Travolta and the rest got a fabulous payday for Old Dogs. Because otherwise, you know, woof." In a review for The Arizona Republic, Goodykoontz gave the film a rating of one and a half stars out of a possible five.

Writing for the San Jose Mercury News in an analysis of movies that were released around Thanksgiving, Randy Myers placed Old Dogs below "The Scraps: Leftovers that should be immediately placed in Fido's bowl." Myers commented, "We have a winner in the Thanksgiving movie turkey contest." Dennis Harvey of Variety wrote, "Too bad this shrilly tuned comedy doesn't demand more than clock-punching effort from everyone involved."
Tim Robey of The Telegraph savaged the film, saying, "Old Dogs is so singularly dreadful it halts time, folds space and plays havoc with the very notion of the self." He added to the review, "Being a film critic is a wonderful job, but there are weeks when the bad film delirium strikes and we’d all be better off in straitjackets. A colleague opined to me the other day that this might be the deadliest run of releases in his 20-year history on the job, and I can completely see that." He also said, "You'd have to hate your family to take them to this!" He gave the film zero stars.

Writing for The Philadelphia Inquirer, Carrie Rickey gave the film a rating of two and a half stars out of four. Rickey commented of the multiple cameos in the film, "A child of 5 can see that these brief appearances serve to pad a gauze-thin script." The review concluded, "Old Dogs may not be good. But the sight of pesky penguins pecking Travolta and Green in the embrace of an unlikely partner makes it just good enough." Pete Hammond of Boxoffice gave the film 3/5 stars, and concluded, "Old Dogs may not reach the box office heights of Wild Hogs but its fun family friendly attitude should guarantee a healthy holiday haul."

Box office
In its first day, Old Dogs opened in fifth place, with a take of $3.1 million. It was beat out in first-day box office results by New Moon, The Blind Side, 2012, and Ninja Assassin. The film came in fourth in its second day with $4.1 million, for a two-day pickup of $7.2 million. The film remained in fourth place for its third day, with a box office take of $6.8 million. Overall, the film grossed $96,753,696 worldwide on a budget of $35,000,000.

The movie was also a moderate success on DVD, gaining more than $20,000,000 (20 million dollars) domestically during its first two months of release.

References

External links

 
 
 
 
 
 

2009 films
2000s buddy comedy films
2000s screwball comedy films
American buddy comedy films
American screwball comedy films
Films directed by Walt Becker
Films set in New York City
Films shot in Connecticut
Films scored by John Debney
Midlife crisis films
Walt Disney Pictures films
2009 comedy films
2000s English-language films
2000s American films